Lisa Lyon (born 1953) is a female bodybuilder and photo model from the United States, and is regarded as one of female bodybuilding's pioneers.

Biography
Born in Los Angeles, California in 1953. Lisa Lyon studied art at the University of California at Los Angeles. There she became accomplished in  the Japanese art of fencing, kendo, but found herself lacking sufficient upper body strength so she began weight training. This eventually led her into bodybuilding.

Lyon entered and won the first International Federation of BodyBuilders Women's World Pro Bodybuilding Championship in Los Angeles on June 16, 1979. This was the only bodybuilding competition of her career. She appeared in many magazines and on television talk shows, promoting bodybuilding for women. She also wrote a book on weight training for women titled Lisa Lyon’s Body Magic, which was published in 1981.

Her stats as taken in October 1980:
Bust 37A, Waist 24", Hips 35", Height 5' 4", Weight 120 lbs, Hair Color  brunette.
At the time, she could dead-lift 225 pounds, bench-press 120 pounds, and squat 265 pounds.

Although Lyon is often cited as the first female bodybuilder to appear in Playboy (in October 1980), she was actually predated by stripper and bodybuilder Kellie Everts, who appeared in a May 1977 pictorial called "Humping Iron".
  
Lyon modeled for Helmut Newton, American fine art photographerJoel-Peter Witkin, and American fine art photographer and boyfriend Robert Mapplethorpe (between 1980 and 1983, Mapplethorpe created over 150 photographs of her, resulting in the 1983 book Lady: Lisa Lyon), and Marcus Leatherdale, who published two pictures of her in his first catalogue book at the Molotov art gallery. Lyon's work with Mapplethorpe was notable owing to Mapplethorpe's depiction of her body as simultaneously traditionally feminine and strong in a conventionally masculine sense.

She was inducted into the IFBB Hall of Fame in 2000 for being a one-woman media-relations activist on behalf of the sport and Elevating bodybuilding to the level of fine art.

Lisa Lyon also had a short acting career:
 Mathilde in Three Crowns of the Sailor from 1983
 Pilar Jones in the bodybuilding movie Getting Physical from 1984
 Cimmaron in Vamp, a low-budget 1986 film starring Grace Jones.

In creating the Marvel Comics character Elektra, Frank Miller initially used Lyon as a basis for the character's appearance.

References

External links
 IFBB Hall of Fame profile
 

American female bodybuilders
1953 births
Living people
Professional bodybuilders
21st-century American women